NGC 2997 is a face-on unbarred spiral galaxy about 40 million light-years away in the faint southern constellation of Antlia. It was discovered March 4, 1793 by German-born astronomer William Herschel. J. L. E. Dreyer described it as, "a remarkable object, very faint, very large, very gradually then very suddenly bright middle and 4 arcsec nucleus. This is the brightest galaxy of the NGC 2997 group of galaxies, and was featured on the cover of the first edition of Galactic Dynamics by James Binney and Scott Tremaine.

This is a grand-design galaxy with a symmetrical, two-armed form. The morphological classification of NGC 2997 is SAB(rs)c, indicating a weakly-barred spiral galaxy (SAB) with an incomplete ring around the bar (rs) and loosely-wound spiral arms (c). It is inclined at an angle of 40° to the line of sight from the Earth, with the major axis aligned along a position angle of 110°. The arms host a series of dusty knots that are star-forming regions being generated through gas compression from density waves. At the core, the arms converge to form a circumnuclear ring with symmetrically-placed hot spots containing super star clusters.

A pair of supernova events have been detected in the proximity of this galaxy. This was determined to be a Type Ib/c supernova.
Supernova SN 2008eh was reported on July 21, 2008, reaching magnitude 15.0.

See also
 Pinwheel Galaxy
 Whirlpool Galaxy

References

External links
 
 
 NGC 2997 in Antlia
 

Unbarred spiral galaxies
Antlia
2997
027978
434- G 35